Gino Pozzo (born 1965) is an Italian businessman and managing director and legal owner of Watford Football Club, who owns a sports investment group focused on the football sector.

Early life 
He is son of Italian businessman Giampaolo Pozzo and a member of the prominent Italian business-owning Pozzo family.

Career 
Pozzo got his start in football as soon as he left university in his early 20s and has built his career around talent scouting and development of high-potential players. Pozzo is reportedly heavily involved in the day-to-day running of Watford F.C., as well as negotiating transfers between his father's football club Udinese Calcio in Italy.

Over the past decade, Pozzo and his family have become notable for their multi-club ownership strategies, including transferring players between Watford F.C., Udinese Calcio, and Granada CF (with Granada CF sold to Chinese businessman Jiang Lizhang in June 2016).

Pozzo runs an international scouting team of 25 to 30 people who seek players through attending every significant competition around the world, especially in developing markets like South America, Africa, and Eastern Europe. Pozzo is reported to have a pattern of investing small sums of money into high-risk players. His larger clubs' network has helped his business to minimize player acquisition costs while maximizing the profit from surging transfer fees as players are transferred and loaned among 'sister clubs' and later sold at a premium achieving high returns.

Pozzo's career experience and business model has led to identifying talent at his three clubs and has been consistently applied to Udinese Calcio for over 25 years, leading some to call it the "talent factory". Granada CF and Watford achieved promotion to LaLiga and Premier League, respectively, through Pozzo's network and transformation from distressed situations. Pozzo's success includes the development of the clubs' own stadiums.

Watford F.C. 
In June 2012, he and his father acquired Watford Football Club from previous owner Laurence Bassini. Pozzo became the sole owner in 2014.

Pozzo is often found at the training grounds and has been known to monitor all players through GPS devices that track the players' performance data while in training. He is known to have minimal contact with players and addresses them as little as once per year, yet observes his teams locally on a weekly basis.

All major decisions regarding the trading of players are made between Gino Pozzo, Scott Duxbury (chief executive of Watford Football Club), and Cristiano Giaretta (technical director of WFC). They have been known to acquire many players from South America, citing lower wage costs however still being highly skilled athletes.

Watford were promoted from the Football League Championship to the Premier League on 25 April 2015. Since 2015, Watford Football Club's annual revenues have increased by more than £100m.

In 2019, Watford made it to the FA Cup Final but were beaten by Manchester City.

In the 2019/20 season, Watford finished in 19th place in the Premier League and were relegated to the EFL Championship.

In the 2020/21 season, Watford finished in 2nd place in the EFL Championship and were promoted back into the Premier League.

In the 2021/22 season, Watford finished in 19th place in the Premier League and were relegated back to the EFL Championship.

Personal life
Pozzo is married to Carla Pozzo and they have two daughters and a son together. They have been living outside London since they left Spain.

References

Living people
Italian businesspeople
Watford F.C. directors
Udinese Calcio
Granada CF
1965 births
Harvard University alumni